GRC '14, short for Giessen Rijswijk Combinatie 2014, is an association football club from Giessen, Netherlands. Home games are played at Sportpark Almbos. It plays in the Eerste Klasse.

History
GRC '14 was founded on July 1, 2014 as a merger of VV Giessen (founded 16 July 1963) and Rijswijkse Boys (founded 6 July 1945). Two years later the club made it to the Eerste Klasse Saturday C from 4th position through playoffs. In 2019–2020 it continues to play in the Eerste Klasse, after just barely keeping out of the relegation playoffs.

Chief coach
 Marcel van Helmond (2014–2018)
 Piet de Kruif (since 2018)

References

External links
Official website
GRC '14 at Hollandse velden

Football clubs in the Netherlands
2014 establishments in the Netherlands
Football clubs in Altena, North Brabant
Association football clubs established in 2014